The Aiyohok Islands are an island group located in the Coronation Gulf, south of Victoria Island, in the Kitikmeot Region, Nunavut, Canada. Other island groups in the vicinity include the Akvitlak Islands, Black Berry Islands, Duke of York Archipelago, Miles Islands, Nauyan Islands, Outcast Islands, and Sisters Islands.

References

 Aiyohok Islands at the Atlas of Canada

Islands of Coronation Gulf
Uninhabited islands of Kitikmeot Region